John McCall may refer to:
 John E. McCall (1859–1920), U.S. Representative from Tennessee
 John T. McCall (1863–1950), member of the New York State Senate
 John McCall (Australian politician) (1860–1919), member of the Tasmanian House of Assembly
 John McCall (1950s footballer), Scottish footballer
 John McCall (footballer, born 1877) (1877–1951), Scottish footballer